Charles Otis (9 May 1906 – 19 December 19, 1970) was a Canadian fencer. He competed in five events at the 1936 Summer Olympics.

References

1906 births
1970 deaths
Canadian male fencers
Olympic fencers of Canada
Fencers at the 1936 Summer Olympics
Fencers from Montreal